Ficus sycomorus, called the sycamore fig or the fig-mulberry (because the leaves resemble those of the mulberry), sycamore, or sycomore, is a fig species that has been cultivated since ancient times.

The term sycamore spelled with an A has also been used for unrelated trees: the great maple, Acer pseudoplatanus, or plane trees, Platanus. The spelling  "sycomore", with an O rather than an A as the second vowel is, if used, specific to Ficus sycomorus.

Distribution
Ficus sycomorus is native to Africa south of the Sahel and north of the Tropic of Capricorn, also excluding the central-west rainforest areas. It also grows naturally in Lebanon; in the southern Arabian Peninsula; in Cyprus; in very localised areas in Madagascar; and in Israel, Palestine and Egypt. In its native habitat, the tree is usually found in rich soils along rivers and in mixed woodlands.

Description
Ficus sycomorus grows to 20 m tall and has a considerable spread, with a dense round crown of spreading branches. The leaves are heart-shaped with a round apex, 14 cm long by 10 cm wide, and arranged spirally around the twig. They are dark green above and lighter with prominent yellow veins below, and both surfaces are rough to the touch. The petiole is 0.5–3 cm long and pubescent. The fruit is a large edible fig, 2–3 cm in diameter, ripening from buff-green to yellow or red. They are borne in thick clusters on long branchlets or the leaf axil. Flowering and fruiting occurs year-round, peaking from July to December. The bark is green-yellow to orange and exfoliates in papery strips to reveal the yellow inner bark.  Like all other figs, it contains a latex.

Cultivation
According to botanists Daniel Zohary and Maria Hopf, the ancient Egyptians cultivated this species "almost exclusively." Remains of F. sycomorus begin to appear in predynastic times and occur in quantity from the start of the third millennium BC. It was the ancient Egyptian Tree of Life. Zohary and Hopf note that "the fruit and the timber, and sometimes even the twigs, are richly represented in the tombs of the Egyptian Early, Middle and Late Kingdoms." In numerous cases the parched fruiting bodies, known as sycons, "bear characteristic gashing marks indicating that this art, which induces ripening, was practised in Egypt in ancient times."

Although this species of fig requires the presence of the symbiotic wasp Ceratosolen arabicus to reproduce sexually, and this insect is extinct in Egypt, Zohay and Hopf have no doubt that Egypt was "the principal area of sycamore fig development." Some of the caskets of mummies in Egypt are made from the wood of this tree. In tropical areas where the wasp is common, complex mini-ecosystems involving the wasp, nematodes, other parasitic wasps, and various larger predators revolve around the life cycle of the fig. The trees' random production of fruit in such environments assures its constant attendance by the insects and animals which form this ecosystem.

A study in 2015 indicated that the sycamore tree was brought to Israel by Philistines during the Iron Age, along with opium poppy and cumin. These sycamore trees used to be numerous in western Beirut, lending their name to the neighborhood of Gemmayzeh (( ), "sycamore fig"). However, the trees have largely disappeared from this area.

Gardens
In the Near East F. sycomorus is an orchard and ornamental tree of great importance and extensive use. It has wide-spreading branches and affords shade.

In religion

Judaism and Christianity
The sycomore was a popular and valuable fruit tree in Jericho and Canaan.
Hebrew Bible
In the Psalms, sycomores are listed with vines as sources of food destroyed in the plagues inflicted on the Egyptians.  This verse implies that Ficus sycomorus could not survive in the mountainous regions of Egypt ("He destroyed their vines with hail, and their sycomore trees with frost." Ps 78:47).
 King David appointed an officer to look after the olives and sycomores of the western foothills. 
 King Solomon made cedars (a more valuable tree) as common as sycomores.  = , 
 In condemning his people's arrogance the prophet Isaiah also makes a contrast between sycomores and cedars. 
 The prophet Amos refers to his secondary occupation as a dresser or tender of sycomores ; this involved slashing the fruits to induce ripening.
Gospels
 In the Gospel of Luke, Zacchaeus resorted to climbing a sycomore in order to get a better view of Jesus in Jericho. 

Mishnah and Gemara (Talmud) 
 In the Mishnah, in chapter 9 of tractate Shevi'it of order Zera'im, the borders of the various districts of the Land of Israel are delineated. The Upper Galilee is defined as the area north of Kfar Hananya where the sycomore does not grow; the Lower Galilee is the area south of Kfar Hananya where the sycomore does grow.
 Tractate Berakhot of the Gemara mentions sycomore in reference to tithing, and to its subsequent appropriate blessing.
 Tractate Pesachim- 53a:8 of the Gemara mentions sycomore in reference to identifying geographic regions, in this case a plain, to determine dates for various purposes.

Other religions
In Kikuyu religion, the sycomore is a sacred tree. All sacrifices to Ngai (or Murungu), the supreme creator, were performed under the tree. Whenever the mugumo tree fell, it symbolised a bad omen and rituals had to be performed by elders in the society. Some of those ceremonies carried out under the Mugumo tree are still observed.

Gallery

See also
 Sycamine
 Ficus vasta

Notes

External links
Figweb.org - Ficus sycomorus
PBS Nature documentary: The Queen of Trees (on the Sycamore fig in Kenya)
pbs.org: The Queen of Trees
pbs.org/wnet/nature: Sycamore fig in Kenya

sycomorus
Flora of Africa
Flora of Cyprus
Flora of Lebanon
Flora of Palestine (region)
Flora of the Arabian Peninsula
Plants described in 1753
Taxa named by Carl Linnaeus
Fruits originating in Africa
Fruits originating in Asia
Garden plants of Africa
Garden plants of Asia
Ornamental trees
Fruit trees
Plants in the Bible